Vyasa (Devanagari: व्यास, vyāsa)  Veda Vyāsa (वेदव्यास, veda-vyāsa) is the title given to the Rishi (sage) who comes at the end of every Dvapara Yuga to divide and compile the one Veda into four and compile the Puranas and Mahabharata for the benefit of mankind in the degraded age that follows, Kali Yuga. Vyasa is a central and revered figure in most Hindu traditions. In the 28th mahayuga (current), Krishna Dvaipāyana Vyasa was Vyasa, whose name refers to his complexion and birthplace, and who is believed to be a partial incarnation of Vishnu that occurs once in every kalpa. In the upcoming 29th mahayuga, Guru Drona's son Rishi Aswatthama will be born as the next Vyasa. In the previous 27th mahayuga, Veda Vyasa's father was Vyasa.

Past Vyasa

The Vishnu Purana has a theory about Vyasa. The Hindu view of the universe is that of a cyclic phenomenon that comes into existence and dissolves repeatedly. Each kalpa cycle is presided over by a number of Manus, one for each manvantara, and each manvantara has a number of Yuga Cycles, each having four yuga ages of declining virtues. The Dvapara Yuga is the third yuga. The Vishnu Purana (Book 3, Ch 3) says:

Twenty-eight times have the Vedas been arranged by the great Rishis in the Vaivasvata Manvantara... and consequently eight and twenty Vyasas have passed away; by whom, in the respective periods, the Veda has been divided into four

During every Dvapara Yuga of the present Vaivasvat Manvantara, different Vyasas have divided the Vedas twenty-eight times. The names of those who acted as Vyasa:
 Lord Brahma
 Prajapati
 Shukracharya
 Brihaspati
 Surya
 Mrityu
 Indra 
 Vashishta
 Saraswat 
 Tridhama
 Trishikh 
 Bharadwaj 
 Antariksh
 Varani
 Trayyarun
 Dhananjay
 Krutunjay
 Jay
 Bharadwaj
 Gautam
 Haryatma
 Vajshrava
 Trinbindhu
 Valmiki
 Shakti
 Parashar
 Jaratkaru
 Krishna Dwaipayan
 Ashwatthama, Drona's son (next Dvapara Yuga)

From Kurma Purana, in every Dvapara Yuga, a Veda Vyasa is born so as to divide the Vedas and disseminate their knowledge. In the present era, there have been twenty eight Dvapara Yugas and therefore been twenty eight individuals who have held the title of Veda Vyasa. The Kurma Purana gives their names as follows:
 Svayambhuva Manu 
 Prajapati
 Ushana
 Brihaspati 
 Savita 
 Mrityu 
 Indra 
 Vashishtha 
 Sarasvata 
 Tridhama 
 Rishabha 
 Suteja 
 Dharma 
 Sachaksha 
 Trayaruni 
 Dhananjaya 
 Kritanjaya 
 Ritanjaya 
 Bharadvaja 
 Goutamaa 
 Vachashrava 
 Nara-Narayana 
 Trinavindu 
 Valmiki 
 Shaktri. 
 Parashara 
 Jatukarna 
 Krishna Dvaipāyana Vyasa
 Aswatthama or Drauni, Drona's son (next Dvapara Yuga)

Krishna Dvaipāyana Vyasa divided the Vedas into four parts and taught them to four of his disciples. He taught:
 Paila the Rig Veda
 Vaishampayana the Yajur Veda
 Jaimini the Sama Veda
 Sumantu the Atharva Veda
 Lomaharshana the Puranas

In Shiva Purana, it mentions various incarnations of Vyasa and Lord Siva. In Varaha Kalpa of the Seventh Manvantara, Lord Vishnu illuminated all the three world by his divine presence. This seventh Manvantara consisted of four yugas which repeated themselves in a cyclic way for twelve times.
 The first Dvapara Yuga, of this seventh manvantara saw the manifestation of lord Shiva for the welfare of the Brahmins. When Kali Yuga arrived Lord Shiva again manifested himself along with goddess Shakti and was known as Mahamuni Shweta. Lord Brahma had the privilege of becoming his disciple.
 During the second Dvapara, sage Vyasa existed as Satya, Prajapati and Lord Shiva became famous as Sutar. Lord Shiva in his incarnation of Sutra had many disciples among whom Dundubhi was very famous.
 During the third Dvapara, sage Vyasa took his incarnation as Bhargava and lord Shiva became famous as Daman. Lord Shiva in his incarnation as Daman had four disciples among whom Vishoka was very famous. When Kali Yuga arrived after this third Dvapara. Lord Shiva along with his Disciples helped Sage Vyasa.
 During the fourth Dvapara, Sage Vyasa took his incarnation as Angira and Lord Shiva as Suhotra. Even in this incarnation Lord Shiva had four disciples among whom Sumukh was very famous. Lord Shiva along with his disciples helped Angira.
 During the fifth Dvapara, sage Vyasa took incarnation as Savita and Lord Shiva as 'Kanka' who was very famous for his tremendous austerities. Kanka had four disciples among whom Sanak was very famous.
 During the sixth Dvapara, sage Vyasa took incarnation as Mrityu and Lord Shiva as 'Lokakshi'. Lokakshi had four disciples among whom Sudhama was very prominent.
 During the seventh Dvapara, sage Vyasa manifested himself as Indra and Lord Shiva as Jaigisatya. Jaigisatya had four disciples among whom Saraswat was very prominent.
 During the eighth Dvapara, sage Vyasa took incarnation as Vashishtha and Lord Shiva as Dadhivahan. Dadhivahan had four disciples among whom Kapila was very famous.
 During the ninth Dvapara, sage Vyasa took incarnation as Saraswat and Lord Shiva as 'Rishabh'. Lord Shiva in his incarnation as Rishabhdeva had four disciples among whom Parashar was very famous.

Current Vyasa

Krishna Dvaipāyana Vyasa lived around the 3rd millennium BCE. The festival of Guru Purnima is dedicated to him. It is also known as Vyasa Purnima, for it is the day believed to be both his birthday and the day he divided the Vedas. He is the author of the Mahabharata, as well as a character in it. He is considered to be the scribe of both the Vedas and Puranas.

Krishna Dvaipāyana Vyasa is also considered to be one of the seven Chiranjivins (long lived, or immortals), who are still in existence according to general Hindu belief. Krishna Dvaipāyana Vyasa will also become one of the Saptarishi in the 8th Manvantara along with sage Kripa, sage Aswatthama and sage Parashurama

Vyas as a surname follow from ‘Vyasa’ and was once awarded to the royal family of ranawas.

Future Vyasa
Ashwatthama or Drauni was the son of Dronacharya. Drona did many years of severe penance to please Lord Shiva in order to obtain a son who possesses the same valiance as of Lord Shiva. Aswatthama is the avatar of one of the eleven Rudras and he is one of the seven Chiranjivi or the immortal ones. He is the grandson of the sage Bharadwaja. He is a mighty Maharathi who fought on the Kaurava side against the Pandavas in Mahabharata war. Aswatthama along with his maternal uncle Kripacharya and Kritavarma is believed to be the lone survivors still living who actually fought in the kurukshetra war. Along with sage Parashurama, sage Krishna Dvaipāyana Vyasa and sage Kripa, Aswatthama is considered to be foremost among the rishis in Kali Yuga. Aswatthama will become the next sage Vyasa, who in turn divide the Veda in 29th Mahayuga of 7th Manvantara. Aswatthama will also become one of the Saptarishi in the 8th Manvantara along with sage Krishna Dvaipāyana Vyasa, sage Kripa and sage Parashurama. Like Bhishma, Drona, Kripa, Karna, and Arjuna, he is a master of the science of weapons and is regarded as the foremost among warriors. Aswatthama studied Dhanurvidya or martial arts and Brahmavidya or the science of the self or Atma from Lord Parasurama, Maharishi Durvasa, Maharishi Krishna Dvaipāyana Vyasa, Bhishma, Kripa and Drona. Aswatthama is the master of all forms of knowledge and possesses complete mastery over 64 forms of arts or Kalas and 18 Vidyas or branches of knowledge.

See also

 Guru Gita
 Parashara
 Mahabharata

Notes

References
 The Mahabharata of Krishna-Dwaipayana Vyasa, translated by Kisari Mohan Ganguli, published between 1883 and 1896
 The Arthashastra, translated by Shamasastry, 1915
 The Vishnu-Purana, translated by H. H. Wilson, 1840
 The Bhagavata-Purana, translated by A. C. Bhaktivedanta Swami Prabhupada, 1988 copyright Bhaktivedanta Book Trust
 The Jataka or Stories of the Buddha's Former Births, edited by E. B. Cowell, 1895

External links
 
 
 Srîmad Bhagavatam (Bhagavata Purana), The Story of the Fortunate One (complete)
 The Mahābhārata – Ganguli translation, full text at sacred-texts.com

Rishis